Meyer Dwass (April 9, 1923 – July 15, 1996) was an American mathematical statistician known for his contributions to applied probability. Dwass was a professor of statistics at Northwestern University.

Born in New Haven, Connecticut, Dwass attended George Washington University, earning a bachelor's degree in 1948. Under supervision of Wassilij Höffding, he earned a Ph.D. from University of North Carolina at Chapel Hill in 1952.

References

External links 
 

1923 births
1996 deaths
American statisticians
George Washington University alumni
University of North Carolina at Chapel Hill alumni
Northwestern University faculty
Scientists from New Haven, Connecticut
Mathematical statisticians